The Ministry of Home Affairs is a government ministry of Tanzania. Its mission is to "save lives and properties, facilitate and control movement of aliens and non-aliens, assist refugees, and rehabilitate convicts through implementation of relevant laws and regulations." The police force, prisons service, immigration service, fire and rescue force, refugees service, and community service are departments of the ministry.

See also
 Minister of Home Affairs (Tanzania)

References

H
Tanzania